Stenotrema florida, common name the Apalachicola slitmouth, is a species of air-breathing land snail, a terrestrial pulmonate gastropod mollusk in the family Polygyridae.

The common name refers to Apalachicola, Florida, USA.

References

 ITIS info
 Encyclopedia of Life info including distribution map
 Jacksonville Shell Club image of the species w. common name

Polygyridae
Gastropods described in 1940